Elwood Good "Speed" Martin (September 15, 1893 – June 14, 1983) was a Major League Baseball player from 1917 to 1922. He was a pitcher for the St. Louis Browns and Chicago Cubs.

Martin pitched for the Cubs in 1918, but did not appear in the 1918 World Series. He won a career-best 11 games for them in 1921.

External links

1893 births
1983 deaths
Major League Baseball pitchers
Baseball players from Washington (state)
St. Louis Browns players
Chicago Cubs players
Medicine Hat Hatters players
Oakland Oaks (baseball) players
St. Paul Saints (AA) players
Sacramento Senators players
Atlanta Crackers players
Seattle Indians players
Mission Reds players
People from Lemon Grove, California